The Pamphilioidea are a small superfamily within the Symphyta (the sawflies), containing some 250 living species restricted to the temperate regions of Eurasia and North America. These hymenopterans share the distinctive feature of a very large, almost prognathous head, which is widest ventrally. 

The superfamily contains two extant families. The Pamphiliidae are the leaf-rolling or web-spinning sawflies such as Acantholyda, Neurotoma, and Pamphilius whose larvae eat plants such as conifers; the adults have simple filiform antennae. The Megalodontesidae include genera such as Megalodontes and several fossil groups. Their larvae eat herbaceous plants, while the adults have serrate or pectinate antennae.

References

Bibliography

 , in Zhang, Z.-Q. (ed.) Animal Biodiversity: An Outline of Higher-level Classification and Survey of Taxonomic Richness (Addenda 2013)
 Rasnitsyn, Alexandr P.; Zhang, Haichun & Wang, Bo (2006): Bizarre fossil insects: web-spinning sawflies of the genus Ferganolyda (Vespida, Pamphilioidea) from the Middle Jurassic of Daohugou, Inner Mongolia, China. Palaeontology 49(4): 907-916.  PDF fulltext
 
 

Sawflies
Hymenoptera superfamilies